The "Kudzu League" are a loosely defined group of prestigious universities in the southern United States.  The term is a parody of the term "Ivy League" (used to designate a set of eight prestigious universities in New England and the mid-Atlantic states) and alludes to the proliferation of kudzu in the American South since its introduction from Japan in the late 1800s for erosion-control purposes.

Schools frequently labeled with the term include:

Private institutions:
Duke University (Durham, North Carolina)
Wake Forest University (Winston-Salem, North Carolina)
Rice University (Houston, Texas)
Vanderbilt University (Nashville, Tennessee)
Tulane University (New Orleans, Louisiana)
University of Miami (Coral Gables, Florida)
Washington and Lee University (Lexington, Virginia)
Davidson College (Davidson, North Carolina)
Emory University (Atlanta, Georgia)
Furman University (Greenville, South Carolina)

Public institutions:
University of Virginia (Charlottesville, Virginia)
University of North Carolina at Chapel Hill (Chapel Hill, North Carolina)
Georgia Institute of Technology (Atlanta, Georgia)
The College of William & Mary (Williamsburg, Virginia)  

As opposed to the Ivy League, which is primarily an athletic organization and not an academic one, the Kudzu league has no official sports requirements. This allows the inclusion of Emory University which has no official football team. Notable alums include Tim Cook, and Newt Gingrich. Similar to the Ivy League, there are no distinct regional barriers to the Kudzu league. While this league is not officially recognized, it has become a sort of recognition among students and connections to the universities to be included in this grouping.

While many of these universities are known for their academic prowess, it is also their commitment to research that has made them stand out as staples of their communities and examples of collegiate success. Many common similarities that these universities hold are their low acceptance rate, rigorous academic courses, and secular acceptance. 

Neologisms
Southern United States